Arthur Hammond was a Canadian documentary filmmaker, associated with the National Film Board of Canada. He was most noted as codirector with Donald Brittain and John Spotton of Never a Backward Step, which won the Canadian Film Award for Best Feature Length Documentary at the 20th Canadian Film Awards in 1968, and for his 1968 film This Land, for which he was a Canadian Film Award nominee for Best Director at the 21st Canadian Film Awards in 1969.

He was also the writer and director of Corporation, a six-part documentary series aired by CBC Television in 1975, and of Imperfect Union, a four-part NFB series on Canadian labour history.

References

External links

Canadian documentary film directors
Canadian documentary film producers
National Film Board of Canada people
Directors of Genie and Canadian Screen Award winners for Best Documentary Film